The 1st constituency of the Bas-Rhin is a French legislative constituency in the Bas-Rhin département, Alsace.

Description

The constituency includes the centre and immediate northern and southern cantons of Strasbourg. All the cantons were held by parties of the left; three for the PS and one for The Greens. It is therefore no surprise that the seat returned a PS member to the National Assembly between 1997 and 2017. However, the seat was won by the centrist LREM party in 2017, before swinging back to the left in 2022, when it was gained by Sandra Regol for EELV, as part of the left-wing NUPES alliance.

Historic representation

Election results

2022

 
 
 
|-
| colspan="8" bgcolor="#E9E9E9"|
|-
 

 
 
 
 
 

*Elkouby stood as the PS candidate at the previous election. As PS endorsed the NUPES candidate, Elkouby's 2017 result is counted in the swing for that candidate.

2017

|- style="background-color:#E9E9E9;text-align:center;"
! colspan="2" rowspan="2" style="text-align:left;" | Candidate
! rowspan="2" colspan="2" style="text-align:left;" | Party
! colspan="2" | 1st round
! colspan="2" | 2nd round
|- style="background-color:#E9E9E9;text-align:center;"
! width="75" | Votes
! width="30" | %
! width="75" | Votes
! width="30" | %
|-
| style="background-color:" |
| style="text-align:left;" | Thierry Michels
| style="text-align:left;" | La République En Marche!
| LREM
| 
| 35.31
| 
| 59.95
|-
| style="background-color:" |
| style="text-align:left;" | Eric Elkouby
| style="text-align:left;" | Socialist Party
| PS
| 
| 13.90
| 
| 40.05
|-
| style="background-color:" |
| style="text-align:left;" | Jean-Marie Brom
| style="text-align:left;" | La France Insoumise
| FI
| 
| 13.49
| colspan="2" style="text-align:left;" |
|-
| style="background-color:" |
| style="text-align:left;" | Elsa Schalck
| style="text-align:left;" | The Republicans
| LR
| 
| 12.91
| colspan="2" style="text-align:left;" |
|-
| style="background-color:" |
| style="text-align:left;" | Abdelkarim Ramdane
| style="text-align:left;" | Ecologist
| ECO
| 
| 7.16
| colspan="2" style="text-align:left;" |
|-
| style="background-color:" |
| style="text-align:left;" | Andréa Didelot
| style="text-align:left;" | National Front
| FN
| 
| 6.34
| colspan="2" style="text-align:left;" |
|-
| style="background-color:" |
| style="text-align:left;" | Sabine Hervault
| style="text-align:left;" | Regionalist
| REG
| 
| 2.20
| colspan="2" style="text-align:left;" |
|-
| style="background-color:" |
| style="text-align:left;" | Salah Koussa
| style="text-align:left;" | Independent
| DIV
| 
| 1.52
| colspan="2" style="text-align:left;" |
|-
| style="background-color:" |
| style="text-align:left;" | Saber Hajem
| style="text-align:left;" | Independent
| DIV
| 
| 1.37
| colspan="2" style="text-align:left;" |
|-
| style="background-color:" |
| style="text-align:left;" | Agnès Lopez
| style="text-align:left;" | Independent
| DIV
| 
| 1.15
| colspan="2" style="text-align:left;" |
|-
| style="background-color:" |
| style="text-align:left;" | Hülliya Turan
| style="text-align:left;" | Communist Party
| PCF
| 
| 1.11
| colspan="2" style="text-align:left;" |
|-
| style="background-color:" |
| style="text-align:left;" | Marie-Françoise Hamard
| style="text-align:left;" | Independent
| DIV
| 
| 0.99
| colspan="2" style="text-align:left;" |
|-
| style="background-color:" |
| style="text-align:left;" | Salomé François-Wilser
| style="text-align:left;" | Ecologist
| ECO
| 
| 0.84
| colspan="2" style="text-align:left;" |
|-
| style="background-color:" |
| style="text-align:left;" | Pascale Hirn
| style="text-align:left;" | Independent
| DIV
| 
| 0.64
| colspan="2" style="text-align:left;" |
|-
| style="background-color:" |
| style="text-align:left;" | Christophe Leprêtre
| style="text-align:left;" | Independent
| DIV
| 
| 0.54
| colspan="2" style="text-align:left;" |
|-
| style="background-color:" |
| style="text-align:left;" | Salah Keltoumi
| style="text-align:left;" | Far Left
| EXG
| 
| 0.33
| colspan="2" style="text-align:left;" |
|-
| style="background-color:" |
| style="text-align:left;" | Pacha Mobasher
| style="text-align:left;" | Miscellaneous Left
| DVG
| 
| 0.10
| colspan="2" style="text-align:left;" |
|-
| style="background-color:" |
| style="text-align:left;" | Nina Hutt
| style="text-align:left;" | Independent
| DIV
| 
| 0.09
| colspan="2" style="text-align:left;" |
|-
| colspan="8" style="background-color:#E9E9E9;"|
|- style="font-weight:bold"
| colspan="4" style="text-align:left;" | Total
| 
| 100%
| 
| 100%
|-
| colspan="8" style="background-color:#E9E9E9;"|
|-
| colspan="4" style="text-align:left;" | Registered voters
| 
| style="background-color:#E9E9E9;"|
| 
| style="background-color:#E9E9E9;"|
|-
| colspan="4" style="text-align:left;" | Blank/Void ballots
| 
| 0.82%
| 
| 9.77%
|-
| colspan="4" style="text-align:left;" | Turnout
| 
| 49.80%
| 
| 40.28%
|-
| colspan="4" style="text-align:left;" | Abstentions
| 
| 50.20%
| 
| 59.72%
|-
| colspan="8" style="background-color:#E9E9E9;"|
|- style="font-weight:bold"
| colspan="6" style="text-align:left;" | Result
| colspan="2" style="background-color:" | LREM GAIN FROM PS
|}

2012

|- style="background-color:#E9E9E9;text-align:center;"
! colspan="2" rowspan="2" style="text-align:left;" | Candidate
! rowspan="2" colspan="2" style="text-align:left;" | Party
! colspan="2" | 1st round
! colspan="2" | 2nd round
|- style="background-color:#E9E9E9;text-align:center;"
! width="75" | Votes
! width="30" | %
! width="75" | Votes
! width="30" | %
|-
| style="background-color:" |
| style="text-align:left;" | Armand Jung
| style="text-align:left;" | Socialist Party
| PS
| 
| 41.89
| 
| 61.61
|-
| style="background-color:" |
| style="text-align:left;" | Anne Hulne
| style="text-align:left;" | Union for a Popular Movement
| UMP
| 
| 28.03
| 
| 38.39
|-
| style="background-color:" |
| style="text-align:left;" | Marie-Christine Aubert
| style="text-align:left;" | National Front
| FN
| 
| 9.40
| colspan="2" style="text-align:left;" |
|-
| style="background-color:" |
| style="text-align:left;" | Josiane Nervi-Gasparini
| style="text-align:left;" | Left Front
| FG
| 
| 7.04
| colspan="2" style="text-align:left;" |
|-
| style="background-color:" |
| style="text-align:left;" | Sandra Regol
| style="text-align:left;" | Europe Ecology - The Greens
| EELV
| 
| 6.63
| colspan="2" style="text-align:left;" |
|-
| style="background-color:" |
| style="text-align:left;" | Jean-Marcel Brule
| style="text-align:left;" | The Centre for France
| CEN
| 
| 3.31
| colspan="2" style="text-align:left;" |
|-
| style="background-color:" |
| style="text-align:left;" | Maurice Hoffmann
| style="text-align:left;" | Other
| AUT
| 
| 1.27
| colspan="2" style="text-align:left;" |
|-
| style="background-color:" |
| style="text-align:left;" | Camille Abgrall
| style="text-align:left;" | Ecologist
| ECO
| 
| 0.96
| colspan="2" style="text-align:left;" |
|-
| style="background-color:" |
| style="text-align:left;" | Sophie Coudray
| style="text-align:left;" | Far Left
| EXG
| 
| 0.55
| colspan="2" style="text-align:left;" |
|-
| style="background-color:" |
| style="text-align:left;" | Arthur Hanon
| style="text-align:left;" | Other
| AUT
| 
| 0.32
| colspan="2" style="text-align:left;" |
|-
| style="background-color:" |
| style="text-align:left;" | Norbert Dumas
| style="text-align:left;" | Other
| AUT
| 
| 0.30
| colspan="2" style="text-align:left;" |
|-
| style="background-color:" |
| style="text-align:left;" | Pierrette Morinaud
| style="text-align:left;" | Far Left
| EXG
| 
| 0.30
| colspan="2" style="text-align:left;" |
|-
| colspan="8" style="background-color:#E9E9E9;"|
|- style="font-weight:bold"
| colspan="4" style="text-align:left;" | Total
| 
| 100%
| 
| 100%
|-
| colspan="8" style="background-color:#E9E9E9;"|
|-
| colspan="4" style="text-align:left;" | Registered voters
| 
| style="background-color:#E9E9E9;"|
| 
| style="background-color:#E9E9E9;"|
|-
| colspan="4" style="text-align:left;" | Blank/Void ballots
| 
| 0.44%
| 
| 2.29%
|-
| colspan="4" style="text-align:left;" | Turnout
| 
| 52.04%
| 
| 49.14%
|-
| colspan="4" style="text-align:left;" | Abstentions
| 
| 47.96%
| 
| 50.86%
|-
| colspan="8" style="background-color:#E9E9E9;"|
|- style="font-weight:bold"
| colspan="6" style="text-align:left;" | Result
| colspan="2" style="background-color:" | PS HOLD
|}

2007

|- style="background-color:#E9E9E9;text-align:center;"
! colspan="2" rowspan="2" style="text-align:left;" | Candidate
! rowspan="2" colspan="2" style="text-align:left;" | Party
! colspan="2" | 1st round
! colspan="2" | 2nd round
|- style="background-color:#E9E9E9;text-align:center;"
! width="75" | Votes
! width="30" | %
! width="75" | Votes
! width="30" | %
|-
| style="background-color:" |
| style="text-align:left;" | Armand Jung
| style="text-align:left;" | Socialist Party
| PS
| 
| 32.96
| 
| 56.27
|-
| style="background-color:" |
| style="text-align:left;" | Frédérique Loutrel
| style="text-align:left;" | Union for a Popular Movement
| UMP
| 
| 31.17
| 
| 43.73
|-
| style="background-color:" |
| style="text-align:left;" | Chantal Cutajar
| style="text-align:left;" | UDF-Democratic Movement
| UDF-MoDem
| 
| 11.74
| colspan="2" style="text-align:left;" |
|-
| style="background-color:" |
| style="text-align:left;" | Martine Calderoli-Lotz
| style="text-align:left;" | Miscellaneous Right
| DVD
| 
| 8.44
| colspan="2" style="text-align:left;" |
|-
| style="background-color:" |
| style="text-align:left;" | Laurent Fritz
| style="text-align:left;" | The Greens
| LV
| 
| 4.84
| colspan="2" style="text-align:left;" |
|-
| style="background-color:" |
| style="text-align:left;" | Bernadette Brenner
| style="text-align:left;" | National Front
| FN
| 
| 3.18
| colspan="2" style="text-align:left;" |
|-
| style="background-color:" |
| style="text-align:left;" | Antonio Gomez
| style="text-align:left;" | Far Left
| EXG
| 
| 2.28
| colspan="2" style="text-align:left;" |
|-
| style="background-color:" |
| style="text-align:left;" | Françoise Werckmann
| style="text-align:left;" | Ecologist
| ECO
| 
| 1.41
| colspan="2" style="text-align:left;" |
|-
| style="background-color:" |
| style="text-align:left;" | Christian Grosse
| style="text-align:left;" | Communist Party
| PCF
| 
| 1.17
| colspan="2" style="text-align:left;" |
|-
| style="background-color:" |
| style="text-align:left;" | Sonia J. Fath
| style="text-align:left;" | Independent
| DIV
| 
| 0.73
| colspan="2" style="text-align:left;" |
|-
| style="background-color:" |
| style="text-align:left;" | Jean-Luc Schaffhauser
| style="text-align:left;" | Miscellaneous Right
| DVD
| 
| 0.64
| colspan="2" style="text-align:left;" |
|-
| style="background-color:" |
| style="text-align:left;" | Jacques Barthel
| style="text-align:left;" | Independent
| DIV
| 
| 0.53
| colspan="2" style="text-align:left;" |
|-
| style="background-color:" |
| style="text-align:left;" | Pierrette Morinaud
| style="text-align:left;" | Far Left
| EXG
| 
| 0.47
| colspan="2" style="text-align:left;" |
|-
| style="background-color:" |
| style="text-align:left;" | Stéphanie Brasseur
| style="text-align:left;" | Far Right
| EXD
| 
| 0.42
| colspan="2" style="text-align:left;" |
|-
| colspan="8" style="background-color:#E9E9E9;"|
|- style="font-weight:bold"
| colspan="4" style="text-align:left;" | Total
| 
| 100%
| 
| 100%
|-
| colspan="8" style="background-color:#E9E9E9;"|
|-
| colspan="4" style="text-align:left;" | Registered voters
| 
| style="background-color:#E9E9E9;"|
| 
| style="background-color:#E9E9E9;"|
|-
| colspan="4" style="text-align:left;" | Blank/Void ballots
| 
| 0.86%
| 
| 1.87%
|-
| colspan="4" style="text-align:left;" | Turnout
| 
| 56.46%
| 
| 54.99%
|-
| colspan="4" style="text-align:left;" | Abstentions
| 
| 43.54%
| 
| 45.01%
|-
| colspan="8" style="background-color:#E9E9E9;"|
|- style="font-weight:bold"
| colspan="6" style="text-align:left;" | Result
| colspan="2" style="background-color:" | PS HOLD
|}

2002

|- style="background-color:#E9E9E9;text-align:center;"
! colspan="2" rowspan="2" style="text-align:left;" | Candidate
! rowspan="2" colspan="2" style="text-align:left;" | Party
! colspan="2" | 1st round
! colspan="2" | 2nd round
|- style="background-color:#E9E9E9;text-align:center;"
! width="75" | Votes
! width="30" | %
! width="75" | Votes
! width="30" | %
|-
| style="background-color:" |
| style="text-align:left;" | Robert Grossmann
| style="text-align:left;" | Union for a Presidential Majority
| UMP
| 
| 37.30
| 
| 49.79
|-
| style="background-color:" |
| style="text-align:left;" | Armand Jung
| style="text-align:left;" | Socialist Party
| PS
| 
| 33.54
| 
| 50.21
|-
| style="background-color:" |
| style="text-align:left;" | Genevieve Auvray
| style="text-align:left;" | National Front
| FN
| 
| 7.12
| colspan="2" style="text-align:left;" |
|-
| style="background-color:" |
| style="text-align:left;" | Laurent Fritz
| style="text-align:left;" | The Greens
| LV
| 
| 3.96
| colspan="2" style="text-align:left;" |
|-
| style="background-color:" |
| style="text-align:left;" | Patrick Beaufrere
| style="text-align:left;" | Union for French Democracy
| UDF
| 
| 3.50
| colspan="2" style="text-align:left;" |
|-
| style="background-color:" |
| style="text-align:left;" | M. Laurence Forrer
| style="text-align:left;" | Miscellaneous Right
| DVD
| 
| 3.06
| colspan="2" style="text-align:left;" |
|-
| style="background-color:" |
| style="text-align:left;" | Luc Gwiazdzinski
| style="text-align:left;" | Miscellaneous Left
| DVG
| 
| 2.40
| colspan="2" style="text-align:left;" |
|-
| style="background-color:" |
| style="text-align:left;" | Jacques Cordonnier
| style="text-align:left;" | Far Right
| EXD
| 
| 2.00
| colspan="2" style="text-align:left;" |
|-
| style="background-color:" |
| style="text-align:left;" | Frederique Riedlin
| style="text-align:left;" | Revolutionary Communist League
| LCR
| 
| 1.23
| colspan="2" style="text-align:left;" |
|-
| style="background-color:" |
| style="text-align:left;" | Christine Kling-Moreau
| style="text-align:left;" | Republican Pole
| PR
| 
| 1.03
| colspan="2" style="text-align:left;" |
|-
| style="background-color:" |
| style="text-align:left;" | J. Louis Amann
| style="text-align:left;" | Ecologist
| ECO
| 
| 1.03
| colspan="2" style="text-align:left;" |
|-
| style="background-color:" |
| style="text-align:left;" | Remy J. Paul Probst
| style="text-align:left;" | Miscellaneous Right
| DVD
| 
| 0.96
| colspan="2" style="text-align:left;" |
|-
| style="background-color:" |
| style="text-align:left;" | Christian Grosse
| style="text-align:left;" | Communist Party
| PCF
| 
| 0.89
| colspan="2" style="text-align:left;" |
|-
| style="background-color:" |
| style="text-align:left;" | Hubert Whitechurch
| style="text-align:left;" | Far Left
| EXG
| 
| 0.66
| colspan="2" style="text-align:left;" |
|-
| style="background-color:" |
| style="text-align:left;" | Jean Paillot
| style="text-align:left;" | Movement for France
| MPF
| 
| 0.66
| colspan="2" style="text-align:left;" |
|-
| style="background-color:" |
| style="text-align:left;" | Pierrette Morinaud
| style="text-align:left;" | Workers’ Struggle
| LO
| 
| 0.50
| colspan="2" style="text-align:left;" |
|-
| style="background-color:" |
| style="text-align:left;" | Bernard Prigent
| style="text-align:left;" | Independent
| DIV
| 
| 0.16
| colspan="2" style="text-align:left;" |
|-
| colspan="8" style="background-color:#E9E9E9;"|
|- style="font-weight:bold"
| colspan="4" style="text-align:left;" | Total
| 
| 100%
| 
| 100%
|-
| colspan="8" style="background-color:#E9E9E9;"|
|-
| colspan="4" style="text-align:left;" | Registered voters
| 
| style="background-color:#E9E9E9;"|
| 
| style="background-color:#E9E9E9;"|
|-
| colspan="4" style="text-align:left;" | Blank/Void ballots
| 
| 0.93%
| 
| 2.33%
|-
| colspan="4" style="text-align:left;" | Turnout
| 
| 63.04%
| 
| 58.62%
|-
| colspan="4" style="text-align:left;" | Abstentions
| 
| 36.96%
| 
| 41.38%
|-
| colspan="8" style="background-color:#E9E9E9;"|
|- style="font-weight:bold"
| colspan="6" style="text-align:left;" | Result
| colspan="2" style="background-color:" | PS HOLD
|}

Sources

Official results of French elections from 2002: "Résultats électoraux officiels en France" (in French).

1